Georgios Theodorakopoulos (born 23 January 1944) is a Greek former water polo player who competed in the 1968 Summer Olympics and in the 1972 Summer Olympics.

References

1944 births
Living people
Greek male water polo players
Olympiacos Water Polo Club players
Olympic water polo players of Greece
Water polo players at the 1968 Summer Olympics
Water polo players at the 1972 Summer Olympics
People from Kalavryta